Elias Lee Francis II (March 16, 1913 – September 11, 2001) was an American politician. He served as lieutenant governor of New Mexico from 1967 to 1970.

Life and career 
Francis was born in Cibola County, New Mexico.

In 1966, Francis was elected to the New Mexico lieutenant governorship, succeeding Mack Easley. He served until 1970, when he was succeeded by Roberto Mondragón.

Francis died in September 2001 at his son's home in Henderson, Nevada, at the age of 88.

References 

1913 births
2001 deaths
People from Cibola County, New Mexico
Lieutenant Governors of New Mexico
20th-century American politicians